Bradda Hill (Manx: Cronk Vradda) is a headland some  north of the village of Port Erin on the Isle of Man.

The path to the summit from Bradda West is part of the Raad ny Foillan, the Isle of Man Coast long distance footpath. Cliffs drop from the summit down to the sea. It shelters Fleshwick Bay from the west. A gorse fire in October 2003 took two days to control, five days to die, and scarred Bradda Hill and other headlands around Fleshwick.

References 
 Isle of Man Guide story about the fire

Marilyns of the Isle of Man
Mountains and hills of the Isle of Man